NGC 230 is a spiral galaxy located in the constellation Cetus. It was discovered in 1886 by Francis Leavenworth.

References

0230
Spiral galaxies
Cetus (constellation)
002539